Chimaphila (prince's pine or wintergreen; from Greek: cheima 'winter' and philos 'lover', hence 'winter lover') is a genus of five species of small, evergreen, flowering plants native to temperate regions of the Northern Hemisphere. They are classified in the family Ericaceae, but were formerly placed in the segregate family Pyrolaceae.

Species
Chimaphila japonica
Chimaphila maculata (spotted wintergreen, also called striped wintergreen, striped prince's pine or rheumatism root)
Chimaphila menziesii (little prince's pine)
Chimaphila monticola
Chimaphila umbellata (umbellate wintergreen, pipsissewa, or prince's pine)

References

 Flora of China: Chimaphila

 
Ericaceae genera